Bol Kaffara (alternatively known as Parlour Wali Larki) is a 2018 Pakistani drama serial which aired on BOL Entertainment. It was directed by Nadia Afgan and written by Fawad Kashif. The drama features Momina Iqbal and was first aired in 2018.

Plot
This story is of an ambitious Sialkot girl Amena who is married to Liaquat and has a son named Ruhan. Liaqut's family are his mother, two married sisters and a younger brother Nasir. Amena's in-laws are greedy who do not give importance to her education; all that matters to them is money, except her brother in law Nasir.

Amena's home consists of her father and sister fatima. She also has an older brother Sajjad, who is married to Shehnaz and has two children. Amena's sister Fatima has one sided love with Nasir. But Nasir is a road side Romeo personality who doesn't like her.

Tables turn when Nasir falls in love with a beautiful girl named Mariyum who are living with family at the rented house which belongs to Amena's father. Nasir is seriously in love with Mariyum and so does she but after some time. He sends her mother to Mariyum house to ask for her hand but in greed his mother goes to Fatima's house and ask for her hand without  even seeing Mariyum.

This breaks Nasir and Mariyum's heart and they move away due to the worst situation. Nasir leaves the city and goes to Lahore so that he can go to Dubai.

On the other hand, Amena starts an internship at a parlour of Saira. Saira takes the order of client Shareef Sharafat who is a bad guy and took them to do makeup for bar dancers who are performing at a farm house party. There coincidentally Amena see his husband Liaquat who become furious after seeing her. Things get worse between Liaquat and Amena and one day he divorces her.

The prime focus of the story of about the struggles of Amena and Mariyum opening their own Parlour and handling it, and becoming famous as Parlour Wali Larki.

Cast
 Momina Iqbal as Mariyum
 Kiran Haq as Amena
 Jana Malik as Shehnaz
 Zaib Khan as Nasir
 Saiqa as Zohra
 Humaira Ali as Nasir and Liaquat's mother
 Roohi Khan
 Khalid Butt as Nazeer
 Zaria Ahmed as Fatima

Broadcast
The soap was released under title Parlour Wali Larki with half an hour running time 4 days a week, when the channel started its regular transmission in December 2018. However, after airing 77 episodes the show was abruptly ended by the channel in May 2019. Later in 2021, channel launched the show again under the title Bol Kaffara airing an hourly episode on Wednesday.

Soundtrack

Poet Asim Raza recreated Nusrat Fateh Ali Khan's Qawwali "Bol Kaffara" for the soundtrack which was sung by Sehar Gul Khan and Shehbaz Fayaz Qawwal. Bol Kaffara song was filmed at tourist attractions in Kallar Kahar Tehsil (Chakwal District) like Swaik Lake and Katas Raj Temples, by cinematographer Ali Bodla. It is one of the most-viewed Pakistani music videos on YouTube.

In 2021, the song was also covered by Anilka Gill and Zaain ul Abideen in BOL Beats. It was also rendered by Indian singers Neha Kakkar and Jubin Nautiyal.

References

External links 

Official website

Pakistani drama television series
2018 Pakistani television series debuts
Urdu-language television shows